S. Wesley Haynes (1892–1983) was an American architect from Massachusetts.

Life
Wesley Haynes was born in Leominster in 1892. He attended the schools in that town, later moving to Boston to continue his education there. He worked as a draftsman for Peabody & Stearns, Allen & Collens, and others. In 1918 he returned to Leominster to open his own office, moving it to Fitchburg in 1920. In 1921 he and Harold E. Mason, an architect formerly of Keene, New Hampshire, formed a partnership, Haynes & Mason. By 1932 Mason was working semi-independently from an office in Leominster, and in 1933 they split completely. Haynes then established the firm of S. W. Haynes & Associates, which remained active until 1962. Upon the new year, the firm was reestablished as Haynes, Lieneck & Smith. Haynes died in 1983, but the office, relocated to Ashby in the 1980s, remains active.

He designed buildings in Massachusetts, New Hampshire, Vermont, and Connecticut, several of which have been placed on the National Register of Historic Places.

Architecture
For the first decade and a half of his career, Haynes primarily designed his buildings in the Colonial Revival style. He designed a number of major buildings in this style, including the Community Memorial Hospital and the Randall Hotel. After 1935, he switched to the Art Deco style, though only briefly. In this style, he designed the Anthony Building on the Fitchburg State campus, the high school at Uxbridge, and the Latchis Hotel in Brattleboro, Vermont. After the beginning of the war he gradually transitioned to the International Style, thus embracing modernism. His Burbank Hospital School of Nursing dates from this period, as is the Peter Noyes School in Sudbury.

For the rest of his career, his and his firm's works were in the Modernist manner. Large educational complexes of this era include the high schools at Saugus, East Longmeadow, Lincoln-Sudbury Regional, and North Andover. Some of Haynes' schools departed from their stripped-down aesthetic to include some more expressive detail, as at Mendon's former Nipmuc Regional High School, and at the fire station in Shirley. These details were probably due to the influence of Paul Lieneck.

In 1966 the office had the chance to design one last major Colonial Revival-influenced work. Calvin Coolidge College, a small Boston school associated with the New England School of Law, had decided on a move out of the city to rural Ashburnham. However, the plans fell through, and the school ceased operations in 1968. The proposed site is today a residential subdivision.

List of works

S. W. Haynes, 1918-1921
 1919 - Pierce School (Remodeling), 593 Main St, Leominster, Massachusetts

Haynes & Mason, 1921-1933
 1923 - Randall Hotel, 2760 White Mountain Hwy, North Conway, New Hampshire
 1927 - Teaticket School, 340 Teaticket Hwy, Falmouth, Massachusetts
 1928 - Gardner Court House, 115 Pleasant St, Gardner, Massachusetts
 1928 - Groton High School, 145 Main St, Groton, Massachusetts
 1928 - Nashoba Cold Storage Warehouse, 81 Central Ave, Ayer, Massachusetts
 1929 - Central Fire Station, 399 Main St, Falmouth, Massachusetts
 1929 - Community Memorial Hospital, 15 Winthrop Ave, Ayer, Massachusetts
 1929 - Springfield High School (Remodeling), Park St, Springfield, Vermont
 1930 - Middle Haddam School, 12 Schoolhouse Lane, Middle Haddam, Connecticut. "“School Building Inspection Reports.” Connecticut State Archives, Connecticut State Library. Education, Department of, 1845-1997 (RG 010) Box 8. School Building Inspection Reports. Folder – East Hampton.
 1931 - Shepardson School, Whittemore Rd, Middlebury, Connecticut
 1933 - Rye School, Washington Rd, Rye, New Hampshire

S. W. Haynes & Associates, 1933-1962
 1934 - Anthony Building, Fitchburg State University, Fitchburg, Massachusetts
 1935 - Abington High School, 1071 Washington St, Abington, Massachusetts
 1935 - Stonington High School, Field St, Pawcatuck, Connecticut
 Highly altered
 1935 - Uxbridge High School, Capron St, Uxbridge, Massachusetts
 1938 - Latchis Hotel, 50 Main St, Brattleboro, Vermont
 1938 - Center School, 65 Thaxter Ave, Abington, Massachusetts
 1938 - New Braintree School, Utley Rd, New Braintree, Massachusetts
 1938 - North School, 171 Adams St, North Abington, Massachusetts
 1939 - Maj. Howard W. Beal Memorial High School (Old), 1 Maple Ave, Shrewsbury, Massachusetts
 1945 - Burbank Hospital School of Nursing (The Highlands), 335 Nichols St, Fitchburg, Massachusetts
 1946 - Lancaster Memorial School (Old), 39 Harvard Rd, Lancaster, Massachusetts
 1946 - Bryn Mawr Elementary School, Swanson Rd, Auburn, Massachusetts
 1948 - F. W. Woolworth Building, 430 Main St, Fitchburg, Massachusetts
 1949 - Peter Noyes Elementary School, 280 Old Sudbury Rd, Sudbury, Massachusetts
 1951 - Birchland Park Junior High School, Mapleshade Ave, East Longmeadow, Massachusetts
 Demolished
 1952 - Acton High School (Old) and Blanchard Auditorium, 16 Charter Rd, Acton, Massachusetts
 1953 - Saugus High School, Pearce Memorial Dr, Saugus, Massachusetts
 1953 - Terminal, Fitchburg Municipal Airport, Fitchburg, Massachusetts
 1956 - East Longmeadow High School, Maple St, East Longmeadow, Massachusetts
 1957 - Lincoln-Sudbury Regional High School, 390 Lincoln Rd, Sudbury, Massachusetts
 Demolished in 2004
 1957 - Southbridge High School (Old), 25 Cole Ave, Southbridge, Massachusetts
 A substantial enlargement of the former Cole Trade School
 1958 - Nipmuc Regional High School (Old), 148 North Rd, Mendon, Massachusetts
 1959 - Georgetown High School, Winter St, Georgetown, Massachusetts
 1960 - Norwell High School (Old), 328 Main St, Norwell, Massachusetts
 Demolished

Haynes, Lieneck & Smith, 1963-1983
 1964 - Crown Point Office Center, 76 Summer St, Fitchburg, Massachusetts
 Originally built in 1940 as Fitchburg General Hospital, closed 1964
 1968 - Shirley Fire Station, 8 Leominster Rd, Shirley, Massachusetts
 1970 - Frances Drake Elementary School, 75 Viscoloid Ave, Leominster, Massachusetts
 1971 - North Andover High School, 430 Osgood St, North Andover, Massachusetts
 Demolished in 2004

References

1892 births
1983 deaths
Architects from Massachusetts
20th-century American architects
People from Fitchburg, Massachusetts
People from Leominster, Massachusetts